Joseph Kneeland was the name of two American silversmiths, active in Boston in the early 1700s.

 Joseph Kneeland (December 14, 1700 – September 1740) was born in Boston, apprenticed about 1715 to John Dixwell, and married Mary Warton on February 6, 1728, with whom he had two sons and three daughters.
 Joseph Kneeland (July 20, 1698 – October 12, 1760) was also born in Boston, and married Elizabeth Chamberlain on November 8, 1722. He is buried in the King's Chapel Burying Ground, Boston.

Attribution of items between these two is inconsistent; the works of one or both are collected in the Harvard Art Museums and Museum of Fine Arts, Boston.

References 
 "Joseph Kneeland", American Silversmiths.
 American Silversmiths and Their Marks: The Definitive (1948) Edition, Stephen G. C. Ensko, Courier Corporation, 2012, page 83.
 American Church Silver of the Seventeenth and Eighteenth Centuries, with a Few Pieces of Domestic Plate, Exhibited at the Museum of Fine Arts, July to December, 1911, Volume 3, George Munson Curtis, Mrs. Florence Virginia (Paull). Berger, Museum of Fine Arts, Boston, 1911, page 83.
 Records Relating to the Early History of Boston ..., Boston (Mass.). Registry Department, Rockwell and Churchill, City Printers, 1898, page 144.
 Seven Centuries In The Kneeland Family, Stillman Foster Kneeland, New York, 1897, pages 65–66 and 70–71.
 "The John Vassal Tankard", Harvard Art Museums.

American silversmiths